Association Peak is a 2,362-meter-elevation (7,749-foot) mountain summit located in Alberta, Canada.

Description

Association Peak is situated in Don Getty Wildland Provincial Park and the Fairholme Range which is a subset of the Canadian Rockies along the range's eastern front. It is set 18 kilometers (11.2 miles) northeast of Canmore and six km north of Mount John Laurie. The nearest major city is Calgary, 75 kilometers to the east. The mountain is visible from the Trans-Canada Highway which traverses the Bow Valley between Calgary and Banff National Park. Precipitation runoff from Association Peak drains north to the South Ghost River, and southeast to the Bow River via Old Fort Creek. Topographic relief is significant as the summit rises 800 meters (2,625 feet) above the creek in two kilometers (1.2 mile).

History

The mountain's well-established toponym was officially adopted March 17, 1967, by the Geographical Names Board of Canada. Association Peak is named for the Indian Association of Alberta which was co-founded in 1939 by John Laurie, who had the mountain to the south named after him at the request of the Stoneys. Both peaks are located within two kilometers of Stoney Indian Reserve.

Geology

Association Peak is composed of sedimentary rock laid down during the Precambrian to Jurassic periods. Formed in shallow seas, this sedimentary rock was pushed east and over the top of younger rock during the Laramide orogeny.

Climate

Based on the Köppen climate classification, Association Peak is located in a subarctic climate zone with cold, snowy winters, and mild summers. Winter temperatures can drop below −20 °C with wind chill factors below −30 °C.

See also
Geography of Alberta
Geology of Alberta

References

External links
 Association Peak: weather forecast

Two-thousanders of Alberta
Alberta's Rockies
Canadian Rockies